The Excellent Care for All Act, 2010 is a law passed by the Ontario Legislature which attempts to make the health care sector more accountable to its patients.

Provisions
The Act was signed into law by Premier Dalton McGuinty in 2010. The Act focused on Ontario patients and the importance of high-quality patient health care. The act stipulates a number of requirements that all healthcare organizations must follow. This includes the maintenance of an active quality committee, performing an annual survey of staff and patients, and linking executive salary to the attainment of quality-improvement targets. The Act also created the Office of the Patient Ombudsman. Legislators believe that these provisions will make the health care sector more accountable to its patients.

References

Health in Ontario
Ontario provincial legislation
2010 in Ontario
2010 in Canadian law